Worlds at War is a 1989 video game published by Lyric Software, and was republished in 1991 by RAW Entertainment.

Gameplay
Worlds at War is a game in which the player and an opponent conquer the planets in a region of space.

Reception
Bob Proctor reviewed the game for Computer Gaming World, and stated that "Worlds At War (WAW) is not spectacular but is well done and workable. The concept isn't novel but it works."

Reviews
Amiga World

References

1989 video games
4X video games
Amiga games
Computer wargames
Digital tabletop games
DOS games
Turn-based strategy video games
Video games developed in the United States
Video games set in outer space